Adam Nowak (born September 28, 1963 in Poznań) is a leader, guitar player and song writer of the Polish music band Raz, Dwa, Trzy. He is a graduate of Zielona Góra Pedagogical University (now the University of Zielona Góra) and currently lives near Toruń with his family.

References

1963 births
Living people
Musicians from Poznań
Polish male guitarists
Polish songwriters
20th-century Polish male  singers